The following is a listing of concert tours by American hard rock band Aerosmith, along with notable individual concert performances. Over 50 years, the band has performed over 2,000 concerts across 51 countries.

Concert tours

Notable concert performances

November 6, 1970: Band's first gig: Nipmuc Regional High School in Mendon, Massachusetts
August 24, 1971: Brad Whitford plays first gig with Aerosmith in Brownsville, Vermont, replacing Ray Tabano
August 5, 1972: Band's signing: Clive Davis signs Aerosmith to Columbia Records at a gig at Max's Kansas City in New York City
July 4, 1978: Aerosmith headlined the Texxas World Music Festival - later released on VHS
February 21, 1990: "Wayne's World" sketch on Saturday Night Live; Performances of "Monkey On My Back" and "Janie's Got a Gun"
August 18, 1990: Aerosmith plays Monsters of Rock with Jimmy Page
September 18, 1990: Aerosmith's MTV Unplugged performance airs on television
December 3, 1991: Performance for MTV's 10th Anniversary show
1993: Live performances of "Dude (Looks Like a Lady)" and "Shut Up and Dance" in Wayne's World 2
October 12, 1993: Performances of "Cryin'" and "Sweet Emotion" on Saturday Night Live; the band also appear in several sketches
May 21/23, 1994: Aerosmith headlined the Rock am Ring festival
June 4, 1994: Aerosmith headlined the Monsters of Rock festival
June 30 / July 3, 1994: Aerosmith headlined the Roskilde Festival
August 13, 1994: The band performs at Woodstock '94
November 26, 1994: The band performs at an MTV Europe Thanksgiving show
December 19, 1994: Performance at the band's Mama Kin Music Hall in Boston, Massachusetts, broadcast live on radio stations
April 4, 1998: Performance of "Pink" at Nickelodeon's Kid's Choice Awards
September 9, 1999: Performance of "Walk This Way" with Kid Rock and Run-DMC at MTV Video Music Awards
January 1, 2000: Performance of "I Don't Want to Miss a Thing" from Osaka, Japan on ABC's New Year's Eve Millennium Celebration
January 28, 2001: Super Bowl XXXV halftime show in Tampa, Florida where the band performs "I Don't Want to Miss a Thing", debuts their new single "Jaded" and is joined by Britney Spears, 'N Sync, Mary J. Blige, and Nelly for a finale performance of "Walk This Way"
March 19, 2001: Performance at the band's induction into Rock and Roll Hall of Fame
October 21, 2001: Performance at United We Stand: What More Can I Give benefit concert in Washington, D.C.
September 4, 2003: Performance at season kickoff of NFL in Washington, D.C.
December 31, 2003: Performance of "Baby, Please Don't Go" on Dick Clark's New Year's Rockin' Eve
February 1, 2004: The band headline the pre-game festivities for Super Bowl XXXVIII in Houston, Texas
June 4, 2004: You Gotta Move special for A&E airs; later released on DVD
July 4, 2006: Steven Tyler and Joe Perry perform with the Boston Pops Orchestra for the Fourth of July; it was broadcast on CBS
September 7, 2007: Nationally televised performance at the Fashion Rocks event in New York City.  The band performed "Dude (Looks Like a Lady)" and "Walk This Way" (featuring Fergie).
August 5, 2009: Steven Tyler falls off the stage at the Sturgis Motorcycle Rally resulting in a broken shoulder and stitches in his head, forcing the band the cancel the rest of the tour.
May 23, 2012: Performance on the season 11 finale of American Idol, where they debut their new single "Legendary Child" and perform their classic hit "Walk This Way"
November 2, 2012: Performance at "Hurricane Sandy: Coming Together" charity concert for victims of Hurricane Sandy
November 5, 2012: Performance on the streets of Boston in front of the band's old apartment at 1325 Commonwealth Avenue to promote the release of Music from Another Dimension!
May 30, 2013: Performance at "Boston Strong" charity concert for victims of the Boston Marathon bombings
April 2, 2017: Performance at the NCAA Final Four Tournament in Phoenix, Arizona

References

External links

A